Bassala Sambou (born 15 October 1997) is a German footballer who plays as a striker for Oldham Athletic on loan from Crewe Alexandra.

Career
Sambou was born in Hannover, to Senegalese parents but moved to London aged seven with his family.

Coventry City
Sambou played Sunday League football before joining Coventry City as a 15-year-old. He progressed through the youth team and was among six players to be signed for the club from the academy as part of an apprenticeship.

Sambou made his professional debut as a substitute for Coventry City on 7 November 2015 in a 2–1 FA Cup first round loss to Northampton Town at the Ricoh Arena, coming on to replace Conor Thomas after 58 minutes. During his final season with Coventry, he scored 25 goals across the under-18s and under-21s teams.

Everton
On 3 June 2016 Sambou signed for side Everton on a three-year deal, being assigned to the under-23 team managed by David Unsworth. Sambou was previously offered a professional contract with Coventry City in February.

Fortuna Sittard
On 23 July 2019, after turning down a new deal with Everton, Sambou joined Eredivisie side Fortuna Sittard on a three-year deal.

On 5 October 2020, Sambou was loaned out to Danish Superliga club Randers FC for the 2020–21 season with an option to buy.

Crewe Alexandra 
On 27 January 2022, Sambou signed an 18-month deal to join EFL League One side Crewe Alexandra, making his debut two days later, coming on as a 75th minute substitute for Oliver Finney in a home defeat by Rotherham United. He scored his first Crewe goal in a 2-1 defeat at Milton Keynes Dons on 5 April 2022.

Early the following season, Sambou was sent off after grabbing Theo Vassell by the throat during an off-the-ball incident in the 31st minute of Crewe's 3-0 League Two defeat at Salford City on 13 August 2022. He apologised for his actions after the game, but faced an automatic three-match suspension plus further disciplinary action by Crewe manager Alex Morris.

On 17 March 2023, Sambou signed for National League club Oldham Athletic on loan until the end of the season, now managed by David Unsworth whom Sambou had played under in his time at the Everton academy.

Career statistics

Honours
Everton U23
Premier League 2: 2016–17, 2018–19
Premier League Cup: 2018–19

Randers
Danish Cup: 2020–21

References

1997 births
Living people
German footballers
English footballers
Footballers from Hanover
German emigrants to England
German people of Senegalese descent
English people of Senegalese descent
Association football forwards
Coventry City F.C. players
Everton F.C. players
Fortuna Sittard players
Randers FC players
Crewe Alexandra F.C. players
Oldham Athletic A.F.C. players
English Football League players
Eredivisie players
Danish Superliga players
English expatriate sportspeople in the Netherlands
English expatriate sportspeople in Denmark
Expatriate footballers in the Netherlands
Expatriate men's footballers in Denmark